Mount Sumbing  or  Gunung Sumbing is an active stratovolcano in Central Java, Indonesia that is symmetrical like its neighbour, Mount Sindoro. The only report of historical eruptions is from 1730. It has created a small phreatic crater at the summit.

Gallery

See also

 List of volcanoes in Indonesia
 List of Ultras of Malay Archipelago

References

External links

 "Sumbing, Indonesia" on Peakbagger
 Climber's guide, 2013

Stratovolcanoes of Indonesia
Mountains of Central Java
Volcanoes of Central Java
Pleistocene stratovolcanoes
Holocene stratovolcanoes